Siri (Sirawa) is a highly endangered Afro-Asiatic language spoken in Bauchi State.

Notes 

Languages of Nigeria
West Chadic languages
Endangered Afroasiatic languages